Barnatt is a surname. Notable people with the surname include:

Luke Barnatt (born 1988), English mixed martial artist 
Nathan Barnatt (born 1981), American actor, comedian, dancer, YouTuber, and filmmaker

See also
Barnett

English-language surnames